Theodoros Lorantos (born 5 July 1971) is a Greek  water polo coach and former player who competed in the 1992 Summer Olympics, in the 1996 Summer Olympics, and in the 2000 Summer Olympics, having scored 12 goals in 19 appearances.  He last coached Greece women's national water polo team. He now is the head coach of France’s national water polo team. 

Lorantos started playing water polo at the age of 16 at NC Vouliagmeni club. In 1997, he won the LEN Cup Winners' Cup with NC Vouliagmeni.

Honours

As player

NC Vouliagmeni 

 Greek water polo championships (4): 1991, 1997, 1998
 2nd place in Greek water polo league (3): 1989, 1996, 1999
 Greek water polo cups (2): 1996, 1999
  LEN Cup Winners' Cup (1): 1997
  LEN Euro Cup
 Runners-up (1): 2004

National Team 

  Silver Medal in 1997 FINA Men's Water Polo World Cup
Olympic Appearances(3): 1992, 1996, 2000

As Coach 
NC Vouliagmeni

 Greek water polo championships (1): 2012
 Greek water polo cups (1): 2012
  2nd place in Greek water polo league (3): 2011, 2013, 2014 
National Team

  Junior Men Water Polo World Championship (2): 2017, 2019
  LEN European U19 Water Polo Championship (1): 2018

References

1971 births
Living people
Greek male water polo players
Olympic water polo players of Greece
Panathinaikos Water Polo Club players
Panathinaikos Water Polo Club coaches
Water polo players at the 1992 Summer Olympics
Water polo players at the 1996 Summer Olympics
Water polo players at the 2000 Summer Olympics
Ethnikos Piraeus Water Polo Club players
Water polo players from Athens